Stegocintractia junci is a species of fungus in the Ustilaginaceae family. It is a plant pathogen infecting sunflowers.

References 

Fungal plant pathogens and diseases
Food plant pathogens and diseases
Ustilaginomycotina
Taxa named by Lewis David de Schweinitz